Klaatu may refer to:

Klaatu (The Day the Earth Stood Still), the protagonist in the 1951 science fiction film and its 2008 remake
 Klaatu (band), a Canadian progressive-rock group formed in 1973
 Klaatu (album), the U.S. name for their first album, 3:47 EST
 Klaatu (comics), a Marvel Comics alien
 Klaatu (Star Wars), a minor character in the original trilogy
 The Klaatu Diskos, a young-adult book series by Pete Hautman
 Klaatu, alien antagonists in Starfleet Orion, a 1978 science-fiction strategy game

See also
 Klaatu barada nikto, an iconic phrase from The Day the Earth Stood Still